The Oslo International Poetry Festival (OIPF) was held on June 14 to 16th, 1985 and also August 14 to 20th, 1986.

Participants were, among many other:

Octavio Paz
Sonia Sanchez
James Baldwin
Andreij Voznesinsky
Gherasim Luca
R. D. Laing
Roger Greenwald
Jan Verner-Carlsson
Protima Bedi
Gherasim Luca
Rolf Jacobsen
Horst Baumann
Piet Hein
Albert Nordengen
Åse Kleveland
Karin Krogh
Noel Cobb
Lawrence Ferlinghetti
William Irwin Thompson
Karl Pribram
Wayne Garcia
Joolz
Randall Meyers
Hazel Henderson
Patricia Leventon
Arne Næss
Francis Huxley
Robert Anton Wilson
Adele Getty,
Ntozake Shange
Ustad Nazim Ali Khan
Sirje Kaerma
A.T.H. Ljungberg
Tomas Tranströmer
Göran Tunström
Bodil Lindfors
Jarkko Laine
Ellen Einan
Warren R. Carlstrom
Arne Nordheim
Rói Patursson
Anthony Barnett
Robert Haraldsen
The Fugs
Erik Bye
Russell Hoban
Walter Ahart
Mathew Collins
Frode Alnæs

The Norwegian author Axel Jensen was chairman of OIPF in 1985 and in 1986. In the committees were also:

Olav Angell
Lasse Tømte
Halfdan W. Freihow
Thomas Bay
Robert Haraldsen
Jan Christian Mollestad
Cecilie Sverre
Kjell Finstad
Kristin Hansen
Randi Mikkelsen
Tone Hovland
Sven Bjørk
Pelle Gustavsen
Erik Varjord
Ellen Lange
Pratibha Jensen
Bjørn Stendahl
Wayne Garcia
Khalid Thathad
Marte Askeland
Geir Giske
Trygve Åslund
Tom Knutzen
Ikhlaque Chan,
Klaus Fjellberg.

Robert Anton Wilson dedicates his book "Wilhelm Reich in Hell","...to all political prisoners, wherever they may be."' and writes: "I recently had the honor of writing the statement of principles that concluded the 1986 International Poetry Festival in Oslo, Norway, which was signed by all the participating artists and scientists. That statement is printed below, to transmit again a signal of solidarity with all victims of tyranny:

References

1985 establishments in Norway
1986 in Norway
Festivals in Oslo
Poetry festivals in Norway
Recurring events established in 1985
Recurring events disestablished in 1986